Statistics of J. League Cup, officially the '99 J.League Yamazaki Nabisco Cup, in the 1999 season.

Overview
It was contested by 26 teams, and Kashiwa Reysol won the championship.

Results

1st round
Consadole Sapporo 1–0 ; 0–3 Avispa Fukuoka
Albirex Niigata 0–3 ; 0–2 Kashiwa Reysol
Vegalta Sendai 1–2 ; 1–4 Sanfrecce Hiroshima
Montedio Yamagata 0–5 ; 1–4 Kyoto Purple Sanga
Omiya Ardija 1–1 ; 0–3 Yokohama F. Marinos
FC Tokyo 1–1 ; 2–1 Vissel Kobe
Kawasaki Frontale 1–3 ; 1–0 Gamba Osaka
Ventforet Kofu 0–2 ; 1–1 Verdy Kawasaki
Sagan Tosu 0–3 ; 0–2 Cerezo Osaka
Oita Trinita 2–1 ; 0–0 Bellmare Hiratsuka

2nd round
Avispa Fukuoka 1–1 ; 0–1 Jubilo Iwata
Cerezo Osaka 0–2 ; 2–1 Kashiwa Reysol
Kyoto Purple Sanga 1–0 ; 0–2 Shimizu S-Pulse
Verdy Kawasaki 0–3 ; 2–4 Nagoya Grampus Eight
FC Tokyo 1–2 ; 4–1 JEF United Ichihara
Sanfrecce Hiroshima 2–3 ; 0–1 Yokohama F. Marinos
Gamba Osaka 1–1 ; 0–1 Kashima Antlers
Oita Trinita 1–0 ; 1–3 Urawa Red Diamonds

Quarterfinals
Kashiwa Reysol 1–1 ; 2–0 Jubilo Iwata
Nagoya Grampus Eight 3–2 ; 0–0 Shimizu S-Pulse
Yokohama F. Marinos 0–3 ; 2–0 FC Tokyo
Urawa Red Diamonds 2–0 ; 0–3 Kashima Antlers

Semifinals
Nagoya Grampus Eight 1–3 ; 2–1 Kashiwa Reysol
Kashima Antlers 2–0 ; 1–1 FC Tokyo

Final

Kashiwa Reysol 2–2 (PK 5–4) Kashima Antlers
Kashiwa Reysol won the championship.

References
rsssf
 J. League

J.League Cup
Lea